Frank H. Knauss (born 1868) was a 19th-century Major League Baseball pitcher  from 1890 to 1895.

External links

19th-century baseball players
Major League Baseball pitchers
Columbus Solons players
Cleveland Spiders players
Cincinnati Reds players
New York Giants (NL) players
Baseball players from Ohio
1868 births
Wheeling National Citys players
Wheeling Nailers (baseball) players
Detroit Wolverines (minor league) players
Providence Grays (minor league) players
Scranton Coal Heavers players
Year of death missing